Eastbourne Town Football Club is an English football club based in Eastbourne, East Sussex, and are currently members of the  and play at The Saffrons.

Founded on 19 October 1881 as Devonshire Park F.C., they are founding members of the Sussex County F.A. in 1882, Southern Amateur Football League in 1907 and the Sussex County Football League in 1920. The club is considered the oldest senior football club in Sussex.

The club is a FA Chartered Standard Community club affiliated to the Sussex County Football Association.

History

Early history (1880-1905)

The Eastbourne Chronicle, dated 13 November 1880 first reported of the formation of Eastbourne United Football Club as a result of the amalgamation between Eastbourne Rovers and Eastbourne FC. The club briefly changed its name to Eastbourne Football Club at a meeting on 5 October 1881. Having failed to secure the use of a ground in South Fields, near to Guildredge Park, permission was sought to play on the grounds of Devonshire Park. Part of the deal was to change the name to Devonshire Park in return the Park Company would supply all match materials and pay travelling expenses to aways games. At a meeting on the 19 October 1881, it was agreed that the club would be known as Devonshire Park F.C. named after the original ground they played at now occupied by the Devonshire Park Lawn Tennis Club which is also the venue for the Eastbourne International Tennis tournament. 

The first recorded game was against Clifton House School on 26 October 1881, which was won by Devonshire Park 5–1. The first loss was against New College on 12 November 1881. A game in which Devonshire Park lost 5 - 0. Their first recorded away win was on 26 November 1881 with an away game at Ardingly College, although the game was played in a 'downpour of rain' and the pitch being in a bad state. Devonshire Park won the game by 4 goals to 1. On 23 September 1882, at a meeting in Brighton with other clubs in Sussex, Devonshire Park became one of eleven clubs that formed the Sussex County Football Association with Captain Cardwell being nominated as one of the vice-presidents for the first season. In the same year was the creation of the Sussex Senior Cup, following a dispute with a cup tie Devonshire Park withdrew from the Sussex County FA.

Playing at Devonshire Park for 5 years, with the Tennis club and a Cricket club, they moved to the then newly opened Saffrons Field in 1886 when the tennis became a predominant sport there and the success of the South of England Championships.
It has been their home since along with Eastbourne Cricket Club and Eastbourne Hockey Club. In 1888, Devonshire Park re-joined the Sussex FA and competed again in the Sussex Senior Cup, reaching the semi-finals with Burgess Hill

In 1889 the club changed its name to Eastbourne F.C. to reflect the expansion of the town after the railway brought in tourism. Although not in a league, and still an amateur team, they competed in the Sussex Senior Cup reaching the final beating Chichester 4–0. The following season the club founder, Rev. Willis was elected as the club secretary and the senior cup was done on a league basis in which Eastbourne won, playing 15 games, winning 14 and drawing a game with Chichester. Eastbourne reached the Sussex Senior Cup final ten times between 1889 and 1903, winning eight times in that period.
Around the turn of the century, Eastbourne played professional teams such as Woolwich Arsenal, Derby County and West Ham United.
It has been recorded that Eastbourne played and won in two international tournaments, In 1904 the 'Meeting du Nouvel' and in 1909 the Challenge International du Nord, both cups were invitations for amateur clubs to compete in.

South Eastern League (1905-1907)
In 1905 Eastbourne FC joined the South Eastern League replacing local rivals, Eastbourne Swifts, who were playing in Division One in the league unable to raise a team. Eastbourne wrote to the league asking to take over from the Swifts team in which the league agreed.
The first season wasn't a success, playing mainly against professional reserve teams in the Football League and were relegated into Division Two. The second season was also unsuccessful and Eastbourne withdrew at the end of the 1906–07 season.

Amateur Football League (1907-1976)

Southern Amateur League (1907-1946)
In 1907 the club split from the Football Association, as they didn't recognise amateur clubs, at a meeting on 25 July 1907, the club committee decided to join the Amateur Football Association and became founding members of the Southern Amateur Football League, along with Ipswich Town, they remained in the league until 1946, winning the Sussex Senior Cup a further three times in that period.
In 1909 Eastbourne were invited to play in the Challenge International du Nord, a competition for amateur teams in both England and France, reaching the final after beating Le Havre AC 2–0, the final was played in front of 2,000 spectators against RC Roubaix and Eastbourne won 5–0. Town entered the competition in December 1909 but withdrew after a dispute with their opponents and at Christmas hosted Paris University, winning 10–1, the following Easter Red Star Paris visited and beat Eastbourne 8–1. On Boxing Day 1910 Eastbourne were defeated 3–2 to Racing Club Paris.

In 1920, the Town was one of the founding teams of the Sussex County Football League. Finishing third in the 1920-21 season and finishing 8th in the Southern Amateur league the same season. They returned fully committed to the Southern Amateur Football League, winning the league twice in 1923 and 1926, and in four consecutive seasons reaching the AFA Senior Cup final, winning the trophy twice, Beating Ealing Association 1–0 in 1922 and 2–0 1925. Also winning the Sussex Senior Cup in 1922.

April 1931 saw the retirement of David Noakes who had managed the club for the past 25 years and his role was taken over by the club captain Mr. W. S. Grevett. In his first two seasons he lifted the Sussex Senior Cup twice and the Sussex RUR Cup in 1933 at their first attempt, but still struggled in the Southern Amateur League, finishing mid table in most seasons. At the end of the 1937–38 season, Eastbourne were relegated into Division 2 A, but came back up the following season after winning the league. The second World War brought a halt to the league and regular friendly fixtures being played, Eastbourne played the 1939–40 season in the Sussex County league, and came sixth in the Eastern Division. 1943 saw their heaviest defeat with an army team. The Southern Amateur League restarted in 1945. The 1945–46 season saw Eastbourne finish 5th in the table.

Corinthian and Athenian Leagues (1946-1976)
In 1946 Eastbourne left the Southern Amateur League and joined the Corinthian League, another amateur football league for teams based in the south of England. Attendances averaged around 3000 and the ground was improved, the pitch moved closer to the cricket ground to allow the Town Hall side to be terraced. Town won the R.U.R Cup twice again in 1948 and in 1950 under manager W.E. Collings but were sadly hovering around mid-table around that period. In December 1950, defender Eric Beardsley became the club's first Amateur International player being selected to play for the England Amateur Team against the Republic of Ireland on 6 January 1951. Sadly he lasted 4 minutes of his debut when he broke his ankle.  In June 1951, Collings resigned from his role as manager after 9 years.

The 1950s saw George Duke, a professional coach between 1949 and 1954, and manager Bob Baker, winning the Sussex Senior Cup in 1953, the last time Eastbourne won this competition. Both were found guilty along with other officials in the club in a fraud conspiracy where amateur players were being paid more than the F.A. amateur salary cap. Duke was banned from football and football management for a period of one year and the club was fined £50.  The club recorded their highest attendance on 10 October 1953, when 7,378 spectators watched local rivals Hastings United play in the FA Cup 2nd Qualifying round. Eastbourne lost the game 7–2. 1954 saw Scottish born Alex White, a former Chelsea Defender briefly manage the team until the end of the season and George Skinner taking over from June 1954 until 1959, later becoming the chief coach for the Sussex FA and later the national coach for Libya, Jordan, Saudi Arabia.

Skinner left in the summer of 1959 and was replaced by Jock McGuire who lifted the Sussex Intermediate Cup for the first time at the end of the season and was replaced by Don Gold who the previous season was coaching the minors team and played for the Town for years before that. Whilst in charge in 1961 saw another milestone in the club's history. A game versus Moulsecoomb Rovers in the FA Amateur Cup saw the Town win 13–1, a feat that has yet to be beaten. Town were finishing around mid-table at this point. In 1963 the Corinthian League merged with the Athenian League and placed in the first division for the first three seasons before being relegated into the second division. Town again were finishing around mid-table. 1967 Town reached the 4th Qualifying Round of the F.A. Cup but lost at home to a strong Margate side 9–0, finished that season in 15th. Town missed out on promotion in the 1968–69 season and finished 3rd by four points, and again nearly reached the 1st round proper of the F.A. Cup drawing Canterbury City 2–2 at the Saffrons in the 4th Qualifying Round, but losing the replay 4–2.

1969–70 season saw success in the A.F.A. Invitation Cup but finished 4th in the league and in 1971 the club being nicknamed as the "town club" for over 80 years, became Eastbourne Town F.C. their present name today. Town reached the finals of the 1971–72 Sussex Senior Cup losing 1–0 to Ringmer at the Goldstone Ground.  Attendances were sadly falling in this period, although reaching the 5th round of the FA Vase in the 1975–76 season, the club resigned from the Athenian League at the end of that season as became uneconomic to remain.

Sussex County League (1976–2007)

Joining the Sussex County Football League for the second time in the 1976–77 season, the team was placed in Division 1 and won the title, a year later they reached the Sussex Senior Cup final losing 4–0 to Worthing at the Goldstone Ground, a regular fixture for the cup between 1952 and 1995. Onwards in the league for 20 years between 1980 and 2000, Town saw 14 different managers and were quite quiet in the Sussex County League. Usually finishing around mid-table. In 1985 Town seemed stronger finishing 3rd in the table and reaching the semi-finals of the R.U.R. Cup. The 1985–86 season Town finished 3rd again, but won the R.U.R Cup which then won again the following season. After which Town were quiet again, finishing in the top five the following two seasons before going back to finishing in the lower half of the table. They nearly missed out relegation in the 1992–93 and 1993–94 seasons finishing 17th both seasons and the 1990s were no improvement to the team. Towards the end of the decade, a joint management team with Rob Thorley and ex-Langney Sports manager Peter Cherry seemed to improve the team but had a shock in the 2000–01 season when Town were relegated for the first ever time into Division Two, along with Lancing and East Preston. With manager Dave Winterton at the helm, Division Two only lasted two seasons, finishing 4th in 2002. The summer of 2002 saw Yemi Odubade sign for Eastbourne Town having moved from Nigeria and became a prolific goal scorer alongside Gary Brockwell contributed to Town's then record of 97 goals in the league but were runners up at the end of the 2002–03 season by 3 points to Rye & Iden and returned to Division 1. Yemi was also top scorer the following season and left in the summer of 2004 when Yeovil Town took an interest in his 70 plus goals in his two seasons at Town, who finished that season in 5th place. Yemi was clearly missed in the 2004–05 season when Town dropped form and Dave Winterton was sacked by the Town board in January 2005, for his aggression to match officials and was replaced by Adrian Colwell 18 days later, finishing the season in 10th place.

Isthmian League (2007–2014)

The 2006–07 season saw them County League champions for the second time in their history, 30 years after the previous time, securing the title by defeating Oakwood F.C. 6–1 away and earning promotion to the Isthmian League Division 1 South. Eastbourne Town survived the first season in the Isthmian League, finishing 18th with 44 points. Danny Bloor replaced Colwell as manager in 2009 and finished the 2008–09 season 13th in the table. In the 2009–10 season, the club finished bottom of the table with just 6 wins, however they were reprieved from relegation when Ashford Town went into administration, Folkestone Invicta and Croydon Athletic both being promoted into the Isthmian Premier Division and a knock on effect from Merthyr Tydfil being expelled from the Southern League and liquidating.

In the 2012–13 season Bloor hired ex Eastbourne Borough manager Gary Wilson as his assistant manager, but Town finished the season 11th in the table, the highest finishing position to date. Bloor left the club in June 2013 and the club saw two different managers over six months. Kevin Laundon between June and August and Tony Reid from August to January 2014. John Lambert took over in January 2014 but after seven seasons, Eastbourne Town were relegated back into the Sussex County League at the end the 2013–14 season.

Southern Combination League (2014-present)
Town came 4th in the Sussex County League Division 1 in 2014–15 season, and reached the quarter finals of the Peter Bentley League Cup, but Town did have success in winning the RUR Cup final scoring two late goals against a 10-man Loxwood.

The 2015–16 season, the Sussex County Football League was renamed and became the Southern Combination League (SCFL) and what was Division 1 became the Premier Division. The 2015–16 season saw Eastbourne finish in 2nd place in the league and reach the 3rd qualifying round of the FA Cup for the first time in 47 years. At this point attendances started to rise as a new fanbase started. 
The 2016-17 and 2017–18 seasons not only saw Eastbourne Town finish 5th in the table but achieve a successful run in the FA Vase by reaching the 4th round on both occasions, losing to Crowborough Athletic and Windsor. The 2018–19 season saw them being knocked out by Abbey Rangers F.C. in the third round, which led them to concentrate the rest of the season on league results, finishing the season 3rd place and reaching the quarter finals of the Sussex Senior Cup, losing to Brighton & Hove Albion Under 23 squad and a tight game which went into extra time.

The 2019–20 season started with more success, by November the Town were unbeaten in the league drawing only two games. Although had been knocked out of the League and Sussex Senior Cups, they were still in the FA Vase beating Windsor 7–1 in the second round. By the end of November, Town had lost two league games, to Lancing and to Crawley Down and again knocked out of the 3rd round of the FA Vase in a tight game away at Leighton Town. By the end February Town were sitting around 3rd place in the table and reached the finals of the Sussex RUR Cup beating Lancing 2–0. In March the league was postponed due to the COVID-19 pandemic and the league was abandoned with all results expunged on 26 March 2020, including the RUR Cup final.

The 2020–21 season started on 5 September 2020, a late start due to the COVID-19 pandemic with only one league cup to compete in, the Sussex Senior Cup. The FA Cup and FA Vase was also played with Eastbourne being knocked out the Preliminary and First Rounds respectively. The season was also halted between 5 November and 2 December as the United Kingdom had a 4 week lockdown. The season briefly restarted but was again halted on 22 December with the season never to restart again. A supplementary shield competition was played in April 2021 with the main league curtailed. Normality was restored in the 2021–22 season, however Town finished 6th place and manager John Lambert and his assistant Jamie Podmore decided to step down from first team management.

On 19 May 2022, it was announced that former Whitehawk manager, Jude Macdonald, would take over as first team manager.

Colours and Badge

Club crest

The club crest is mostly based on the Eastbourne coat of arms. As with all the other Eastbourne sports teams who use the same basis of the town crest, with the exception of rival team Eastbourne United also used the same town crest until their merger with Shinewater Association in 2003. And Eastbourne Borough, who have their own crest.
Over the years the club crest has had different colour versions. For a while the crest was in blue and yellow instead of the red and white as used by the town council and the Hockey and Rugby clubs in the town, but reverted in 2019.

 The red bars being from the Badlesmere family landowners of the Eastbourne area and residing in Bourne Place, now known as Compton Place in the 14th century.
 The stags heads from the Arms of the Duke of Devonshire,  the principle landowners of Eastbourne, notably the landowners of The Saffrons.
 The Rose and visor from the Arms of the Davies-Gilbert family, another large landowner of the town.
The Seahorse above the crest to resemble Eastbourne as a coastal town.

Both the Devonshire and Davies-Gilbert families contributed in developing Eastbourne in the 1850s.
The motto 'MELIORA SEQUIMUR' is translated to "We follow the better things", also on the Eastbourne Coat of arms.

Football Kits
The club's colours have mainly been yellow and blue, the colours that represent the county of Sussex. The club originally played in yellow and blue halves until just before the 1960s when the team played in yellow shirts with variations over the years.

Kit suppliers and shirt sponsors

Ground

Devonshire Park (1881–1886)

Originally a cricket ground, Devonshire Park opened its gates in 1874, with Tennis courts added in 1879. Devonshire Park FC being formed in 1881, played on a grass pitch here the same time the South of England Championships tournament started.

The first recorded game played here by Devonshire Park was on 12 November 1881 versus New College, a game which Devonshire Park lost 5 - 0.

After 5 years as the tournament became popular, both the football team and cricket team moved 500 meters northwest to the newly opened Saffrons Field.

Devonshire Park is still open and is the current venue for the annual Eastbourne International tennis tournament.

The Saffrons (1886–present)

Eastbourne Town currently play their home games at The Saffrons, Compton Place Road, Eastbourne, East Sussex, BN21 1EA. Located in Eastbourne town centre, a 5-minute walk from Eastbourne Railway Station.

Eastbourne Town have played football here since 1886, when the then Devonshire Park Football Club moved grounds from their former namesake (now the venue for the Eastbourne International tennis tournament).

The ground is enclosed with a cricket pitch, hockey pitch and grass bowls surrounding three sides of the ground, all of which share a clubhouse. There is a capacity limit of 3,000 spectators and seating for 200.
The gate house at the Meads Road end was built in 1914. 1994 Also saw the main stand and floodlights installed. There is also an uninterrupted view of the Town Hall, the chimes are often heard during home games.

Supporters

First reference of the Eastbourne Supporters Club goes back to September 1930 when the club reported growing membership numbers. The club was formed to encourage its supporters to visit games at home buy introducing season tickets and arranging transport to away games. By September 1937 membership was noted at 148 members and slowly growing. By June 1951 the membership was totalled at 949 members. Numbers dropped in the 1970s.

In the present day Eastbourne Town's support now includes two main supporters groups Pier Pressure and the Beachy Head Ultras. Started in 2015, the groups follow the European ultras tradition and were formed by local fans disengaged with modern professional football. The club's supporters groups have regularly backed anti-discrimination and anti-homophobia initiatives, amongst many other initiatives within the community. Pier Pressure have strong links with the Whitehawk Ultra's and both groups regularly visit each other's games. There has also been similar links with the supporters of Dulwich Hamlet and Clapton Community.

Pier Pressure are often heard at both home and away games, often with drums, big flags and unique chanting. An occasional saxophone makes an appearance at certain games. A youth section was formed during the 2018–19 season, with kids from local schools, who make use of the free entry, join in. Bringing in their own drums and flags for support.

The groups have gained attention for their graphic work for the club (programmes, merchandising and promotional posters) using an eclectic range of visuals relating to Eastbourne including Throbbing Gristle's 20 Jazz Funk Greats, co-author of the Communist Manifesto; Friedrich Engels (whose ashes were scattered in the town) and Aleister Crowley (who edited a Chess column for the local newspaper).

Eastbourne Town often has games where over 100 people attend. In March 2019 it was noted that Eastbourne Town, along with Peacehaven & Telscombe, were 8th in the top 13 Non-league Sussex clubs with the highest attendance. The average standing at 257.

Rivals
Eastbourne is one of very few towns to have three senior teams. The highest ranked of these, Eastbourne Borough, who play in the National League South aren't considered as rivals since they compete at a considerably higher level. The other, Eastbourne United, play in the Southern Combination Premier League with Eastbourne Town. Local team Little Common, who are some 10 miles away near Bexhill. ground shared with Eastbourne United until 2022. Until 2021 Langney Wanderers were another rival team until the club folded

Eastbourne Derby

For many years, the unofficial named Eastbourne Derby has been played between Eastbourne Town and Eastbourne United, often attracting big crowds. The first competitive meeting between the two clubs was in 1920 in the East Sussex Challenge Cup between Eastbourne (Town) and Eastbourne Royal Engineers Old Comrades (United). Eastbourne won the game 2–1 in front of a crowd of 3,671 spectators at The Saffrons. During the 2018–19 at the Boxing Day fixture saw a record crowd in the 21st century of 856 people. The game was won by Eastbourne Town 5 goals to nil. Currently 32 league games and 64 cup games have been played between the two clubs.

League Meetings

Cup Games

Players

Current squad
Correct as of 11 March 2023

Notable former players

Club officials
Source:

Boardroom staff

Coaching staff

Management history

Between 1880 and 1942 Eastbourne Town managers were known as Honorable Secretaries, nominated at each Annual General Meeting. after which they were known as Managers.

Key
League matches only. M = Matches played; W = Matches won; D = Matches drawn; L = Matches lost; Win % = percentage of total matches won
  Managers with this background and symbol in the "Name" column are italicised to denote caretaker appointments.
  Managers with this background and symbol in the "Name" column are italicised to denote caretaker appointments promoted to full-time manager.

Stats as of 18 March 2023.

Other teams
The club runs two FA Chartered youth teams and a ladies team:

 Eastbourne Town Under 18's competing in the Southern Combination Under 18 (East) League
 Eastbourne Town Under 23's competing in the Southern Combination Under 23 (East) League
 Eastbourne Town Women, competing in the Sussex County Women and Girls Football League Division One

Eastbourne Town also run several other younger age group youth teams after a merger in 2010/11 with Old Town Boys F.C. OTBFC were established in 1983.

Honours

First team

League
Southern Amateur League
Division One Champions (2): 1922–23, 1925-26
Division One Runners Up (2): 1921–22, 1929–30
Division Two Champions (1): 1938–39
Section A Runners Up (1): 1919–20
Section B Runners Up (1): 1911–12

Sussex County/Southern Combination League:
 Champions (2): 1976–77, 2006–07
 Premier Division Runners Up (1): 2015–16
 Division 2 Runners Up (1): 2002-03

Cups (Domestic)
Sussex Senior Challenge Cup:
 Winners (12): 1889–90, 1890–91, 1893–94, 1894–95, 1898–99, 1899–1900, 1900–01, 1902–03, 1921–22, 1931–32, 1932–33, 1952–53
 Runners Up (10): 1892–93, 1896-97, 1906-07, 1920-21, 1922-23, 1925-26, 1927-28, 1950-51, 1972-73, 1977-78

The Sussex Royal Ulster Rifles Charity Cup
 Winners (6): 1932–33, 1947–48, 1949–50, 1985–86, 1986–87, 2014–15
 Runners Up (5): 1919–20, 1925–26, 1945–46, 1955–56, 1963–64

Amateur Football Alliance Senior Cup:
 Winners (2): 1921-22, 1924-25
 Runners Up (2): 1922-23, 1923-24

Amateur Football Alliance – Invitation Cup:
 Winners (1): 1969–70

Amateur Football Alliance – Veterans Challenge Cup
 Winners (1): 1986–87

Athenian League Challenge Cup:
 Runners Up (1): 1975-76

Borough Centenary Cup:
 Winners (1) 1986

Eastbourne Charity Cup:
 Winners (35) 1898, 1900, 1910, 1914, 1920, 1921, 1926, 1927, 1933, 1934, 1935, 1936, 1937, 1938, 1939, 1948, 1950, 1951, 1953, 1955, 1959, 1962, 1963, 1965, 1966, 1969, 1970, 1981, 1982, 1983, 1984, 1986, 1988, 1989, 2000

John Gower Memorial Trophy:
 Winners (1) 1990

Maybank Cup:
 Winners (1) 1988

Newhaven Charity Cup:
 Winners (1) 1949

Round Table Trophy:
 Winners (1) 1971

Sussex County League – Division Two League Cup:
 Runners-Up (1): 2001–02

Cups (International)

Tournoi du Nouvel An Paris:
 Winners (1): 1904
Challenge International du Nord:
 Winners (1): 1909

Reserve / Under-23's team

League
Southern Amateur League:
Reserve Division Three Champions (1): 1931–32

Sussex County/Southern Combination League:
Reserve Secion East Champions (4): 1978–79, 1989–90, 1994–95, 2001–02
Reserve Premier Division Champions (4) : 2005–06, 2008–09, 2010–11, 2011–12

Cups
Sussex County/Southern Combination League Cup:
Winners (3): 1997–98, 2008–09, 2015–16

Sussex Intermediate Cup
 Winners (3): 1959–60, 2003–04, 2010–11

Club records

Record attendance: 7,378, FA Cup Qualifying v Hastings United, 1953–54
Biggest Win: 14 - 1 v Moulscoomb Rovers, FA Amateur Cup, 30 September 1961
Biggest Loss 0 - 10 v Ipswich Town, Southern Amateur League 30 April 1932
Most points in a season: 86 in 38 games, Southern Combination Premier, 2015–16
Fewest points in a season: 29 in 42 games, Isthmian League Division One South, 2009–10

Best League Performance: Isthmian League Division One South, 11th, 2012–13
Best FA Cup performance: 4th Qualifying Round, 1946–47, 1950–51, 1967–68, 1968-69
Best FA Trophy performance: 1st Qualifying Round, 2007–08, 2011–12, 2012–13, 2013-14
Best FA Vase performance: 5th Round, 1975–76
Best FA Amateur Cup performance: 3rd Round, 1945–46, 1950-51

Player records

Appearances
Most overall appearances: 602 – Syd Myall (1962–1979)
Most league appearances: 436 – Syd Myall (1962–1979)
Most cup appearances: 166 – Syd Myall (1962–1979)

Goalscorers
Record overall goal scorer: 207 – Guy Hollobone (1919–1928)
Record league goal scorer: 125 – Gary Brockwell (1997–2010)
Most goals in a season: 44 – Yemi Odubade (2002–03)
Most league goals in a season: 36 – Yemi Odubade (2002–03)
Most goals in a league match: 7 – Paddy Tracey, v Ealing Association, 5 January 1946
Most goals in a cup match: 7 – Eric Farnfield, v East Grinstead Town, 27 December 1919

References

External links

Official website

 
Football clubs in England
Isthmian League
Southern Combination Football League
Sport in Eastbourne
Corinthian League (football)
Athenian League
Football clubs in East Sussex
1881 establishments in England
Association football clubs established in 1881
Southern Amateur Football League